Manuel José Othón (June 14, 1858 – November 28, 1906) was a Mexican poet, playwright, and politician. One of his most famous works is Idilio salvaje, considered one of the most representative poems of Mexico.

Early life and studies

Othón was born in San Luis Potosí, San Luis Potosí, Mexico.

During his life he worked for the following newspapers and magazines:
El Búcaro
El Pensamiento
La Esmeralda
La Voz de San Luis
El Correo de San Luis
El Estandarte and
El Contemporáneo.

Literary life

Othón began writing poetry at the age of 13. At 21, he began to publish his works under the name of Poesías. Three years later he published another poetry book. He wrote his most well-known poem Idilio salvaje in 1906.

Death and legacy
Othón died in San Luis Potosí on November 28, 1906. His remains were moved to The Rotunda of Illustrious People of the Panteón de Dolores in Mexico City in 1964. Some of his work was published after his death in 1906.

References

External links
Biography in Spanish
Artwork

1858 births
1906 deaths
20th-century Mexican poets
20th-century Mexican male writers
Mexican male poets
People from San Luis Potosí City
Mexican dramatists and playwrights
19th-century Mexican poets
19th-century Mexican dramatists and playwrights
Male dramatists and playwrights
19th-century male writers